The South Africa cricket team toured Pakistan in January 2021 to play two Test matches and three Twenty20 International (T20I) matches against the Pakistan cricket team. The Test series formed part of the inaugural 2019–2021 ICC World Test Championship. It was the first time in fourteen years that South Africa toured Pakistan.

In December 2020, Cricket South Africa (CSA) confirmed that they would be touring Pakistan. The Test matches took place in Karachi and Rawalpindi, with the T20I matches being played in Lahore.

Pakistan won the first Test by seven wickets, to take a 1–0 lead in the series. Pakistan won the second Test by 95 runs, taking the series 2–0, and recording their first series win against South Africa since October 2003. The T20I series was level after the first two matches, with Pakistan winning the third match by four wickets, winning the series 2–1. With winning the third match, Pakistan became the first men's team to win 100 T20I matches.

Background
After successfully arranging a limited-overs series against Sri Lanka in Pakistan, the Pakistan Cricket Board (PCB) chairman, Ehsan Mani announced that they would no longer play their future home matches at a neutral venue. For the tour to go ahead, Cricket South Africa needed to grant permission for their players to travel as a group, due to the situation of the COVID-19 pandemic in South Africa. In August 2020, the South Africa women's team were denied a request to travel to England.

On 25 September 2020, the PCB confirmed that the South African team would be touring Pakistan, as per the schedule. A month later, Cricket South Africa sent a security delegation to Pakistan to perform a feasibility assessment for the tour. South Africa last toured Pakistan in October 2007. On 16 January 2021, the PCB named the match officials for the tour. Aleem Dar, who has been the on-field umpire for 132 Tests prior to the tour, stood in his first Test match at home. Ahsan Raza also made his debut as an on-field umpire in Test cricket.

Squads

In December 2020, Pakistan's Shadab Khan suffered an injury ahead of the Test series against New Zealand. On 26 December 2020, the Pakistan Cricket Board (PCB) confirmed that he had been ruled out of the second Test against New Zealand, and the Test matches at home against South Africa. Before South Africa departed for the tour, Ottniel Baartman was ruled out of their Test squad, with Marco Jansen named as his replacement. On 24 January 2021, the PCB confirmed that seventeen players would be available for selection for the first Test match, with Abdullah Shafique, Kamran Ghulam and Agha Salman staying with the squad for training sessions. The PCB also retained the same seventeen players for selection for the second Test match.

Test series

1st Test

2nd Test

T20I series

1st T20I

2nd T20I

3rd T20I

Notes

References

External links
 Series home at ESPN Cricinfo

2021 in Pakistani cricket
2021 in South African cricket
International cricket competitions in 2020–21
2020-21